West Dean Woods is a  biological Site of Special Scientific Interest north of West Dean in West Sussex. It is managed by the Sussex Wildlife Trust.

These woods have records dating back to the sixteenth century. The ground layer is rich in flowering plants, including  white helleborine, fly orchid and around two million wild daffodils. Thirty five bryophytes have been recorded and invertebrates include two rare hoverflies which live on dead wood, Cheilosa carbonaria and Cheilosa nigripes.

There is no public access to the site.

References

Sussex Wildlife Trust
Sites of Special Scientific Interest in West Sussex
Forests and woodlands of West Sussex